Phostria sexguttata is a moth in the family Crambidae. It was described by William Jacob Holland in 1920. It is found in the Democratic Republic of the Congo.

References

Phostria
Moths described in 1920
Moths of Africa